Aigul Gareeva (born 22 August 2001) is a Russian professional racing cyclist, who currently rides for UCI Women's Continental Team . At the 2019 UCI Road World Championships in Yorkshire, England, she won the gold medal in the women's junior time trial event.

In January 2022, Gareeva was provisionally suspended for missing three anti-doping controls. She could face a two-year ban.

Major results
2018
 1st  Road race, UEC European Junior Road Championships
 1st  Time trial, National Junior Road Championships
2019
 UCI Junior Road World Championships
1st  Time trial
4th Road race
 National Junior Road Championships
1st  Road race
1st  Time trial
 2nd  Time trial, UEC European Junior Road Championships

References

External links
 

2001 births
Living people
Russian female cyclists
Place of birth missing (living people)
Cyclists at the 2018 Summer Youth Olympics